Sidney Arthur Robin George Drogo "Kim" Montagu, 11th Duke of Manchester (5 February 1929 in Kimbolton Castle, Huntingdonshire – 3 June 1985), was a British hereditary peer, the son of the 10th Duke of Manchester and the elder brother of the 12th Duke.

Personal life
He married firstly on 5 February 1955 (div. 1977/1978) Adrienne Valerie Christie (d. 1988), daughter of Commander John Kenneth Christie, Ambassador of South Africa in Kenya; later Karawater farmer, near Ruigtevlei, Cape Town, South Africa. He married secondly on 25 August 1978 Andrea Joss, daughter of Cecil Alexander Joss of Johannesburg, South Africa (d. 21 January 1996), who had previously been married twice, to Major S. Whitehead and to G. J. W. Kent. He had no children from either marriage.

In 1983, the Duke sued his stepmother, Elizabeth, who he believed had possession of several family heirlooms that he felt were rightfully his.

The Duke died suddenly at Robin Hood Ranch, Tennessee, on 3 June 1985. His funeral took place on 13 June and he is buried at Kimbolton Parish Church.

Gallery

References

1929 births
1985 deaths
Sidney Montagu, 11th Duke of Manchester
Sidney